"Keep It Burnin" (stylized in all caps) is a song by American rapper Future featuring fellow American rapper Kanye West. It was first released on April 29, 2022, from Future's ninth studio album I Never Liked You, with an accompanying music video. It was sent to Italian contemporary hit radio on May 6, 2022, as the third official single from the album.

Background
The song was originally recorded for Kanye West's album Donda 2. An early version with unfinished vocals appeared on an early version of the album from West's $200 Stem Player, but was removed shortly after. This version notably contains an interpolation of "Burning Down the House" by new wave band Talking Heads.

Composition and lyrics
The song features a "progressive" trap production, over which the two artists reflect on where they each came from. Kanye West addresses his divorce from Kim Kardashian, first referencing buying a house next to hers ("I'ma buy a home next to your home if I miss you"). He also makes references to Kardashian's lack of support for his 2020 presidential campaign, as well as his plan to run for president again in 2024: "Rubbin' on your ass but your mouth is the issue / When you run for '24, I bet your spouse gon' be with you". Meanwhile, Future raps about his journey to fame and his past ("Seen too much violence, done seen too much death / Bodies on bodies, got a gang full of them / Raised by gangsters, prostitutes and pimps").

Music video
The official music video was directed by Rick Nyce. In it, Future and Kanye West are seen under a circular spotlight in a warehouse, surrounded by darkness, through bird's-eye view. Both are dressed in all black, while Future wears a hood and sunglasses and West's face is covered with a black mask. They rap and show some dance moves while surrounded by their crews.

Charts

Release history

References

2022 singles
2022 songs
Future (rapper) songs
Kanye West songs
Songs written by Future (rapper)
Songs written by Kanye West
Epic Records singles
Diss tracks
Songs written by ATL Jacob